Bivins is a surname. Notable people with the surname include:

Charlie Bivins (born 1938), retired National Football League running back
Jimmy Bivins (1919–2012), American heavyweight boxer
Michael Bivins (born 1968), founder and member of the R&B group New Edition and the hip hop group Bell Biv DeVoe 
Teel Bivins (1947–2009), Texas state senator and ambassador to Sweden
Terry Bivins (born 1943), former NASCAR Cup Series driver
Tim Bivins (born 1952), Illinois state senator

See also
Bivin (disambiguation)